Henry F. Campbell Mansion, also known as Esates Apartments, is a historic home located at Indianapolis, Marion County, Indiana.  It was built between 1916 and 1922, and is a large -story, Italian Renaissance style cream colored brick and terra cotta mansion.  It has a green terra cotta tile hipped roof. The house features a semi-circular entry portico supported by 10 Tuscan order marble columns.  Also on the property are the contributing gardener's house, six-car garage, barn, and a garden shed.

It was added to the National Register of Historic Places in 1997.

References

External links

Houses on the National Register of Historic Places in Indiana
Renaissance Revival architecture in Indiana
Houses completed in 1922
Houses in Indianapolis
National Register of Historic Places in Indianapolis